Jurassic Nunatak is a small nunatak  northeast of Triassic Nunatak in the Yee Nunataks of Palmer Land, Antarctica. It was mapped by the United States Geological Survey from surveys and U.S. Navy aerial photographs, 1961–68, and was named by the Advisory Committee on Antarctic Names in 1987 after the Jurassic period in geological time and in association with Triassic Nunatak. The name does not imply the age of the rock constituting this feature.

References

Nunataks of Palmer Land